David James Clendon (born 11 September 1955) is a New Zealand politician and former member of the Green Party. Following the resignation of Sue Bradford, Clendon became a member of the House of Representatives on 2 November 2009.

Personal life
Clendon is of Ngāpuhi, Te Roroa and Pākehā descent. He is a descendant of James Reddy Clendon, the United States Consul in New Zealand. He has a partner, Lindis, and one daughter Kaya.

Political career
Clendon joined the Green Party in 1990. In both the 1999 and 2005 elections, Clendon polled third in the seat of Waitakere, ranked 19th and 12th on the party list, respectively.

Clendon was the co-convenor of the Green Party from 2001 to 2004.  He did not contest the 2002 general election because the party's constitution bars co-convenors from standing for parliament.

Along with MP Nándor Tánczos, former MP Mike Ward and 2005 election campaign manager Russel Norman, Clendon contested the Green's male leadership role in 2005 after the unexpected death of co-leader Rod Donald, saying that it made sense to "appoint an out-of-Parliament leader, rather than stretch the sitting MPs even further." Norman won the leadership after a vote at a party AGM in June 2006.

Clendon was elected as a Councillor for the Far North District in 2019.

Member of Parliament

In the 2008 general election Clendon was ranked tenth on the Green list and stood as a candidate in the Helensville electorate, coming third with 5.96% of the electorate vote. Following the resignation of list MP Sue Bradford, Clendon entered Parliament as he was next on the Green party list. He became a Member of Parliament on 2 November 2009  and delivered his maiden speech to Parliament on 17 November.

A private member's bill in Clendon's name was drawn from the ballot in February 2010. The Smart Meters (Consumer Choice) Bill would require that domestic power users be advised on the options available for the use of smart meters in their homes. It was voted down by the Government later that year.

On 7 August 2017, Clendon and fellow Green Party MP Kennedy Graham announced that they were planning to resign as Green Party candidates for the 2017 election, after revelations that Party co-leader Metiria Turei committed benefit and electoral fraud. Graham and Clendon stated that their resignations were due to the public positions she had taken regarding her offending, and her subsequent refusal to step down from her leadership role.  The next day, both Clendon and Graham resigned from the Party caucus, after there were moves to remove them involuntarily. On 9 August 2017, Turei resigned as co-leader of the Party and as a list candidate for the 2017 election.

Spokesperson roles
Clendon was the Green Party's spokesperson on the Auckland Supercity, Commerce, Consumer Affairs, Corrections, ICT, Resource Management Act, Small Business, Tertiary Education, Tourism, Māori Affairs and Research Science and Technology.

Notes

References

External links

Profile at Green Party of Aotearoa New Zealand website (archived 14 June 2017)
Parliamentary website profile (showing his role as "musterer", formerly "deputy musterer")

1955 births
Living people
Green Party of Aotearoa New Zealand MPs
New Zealand left-wing activists
New Zealand list MPs
Unsuccessful candidates in the 1999 New Zealand general election
Unsuccessful candidates in the 2005 New Zealand general election
Unsuccessful candidates in the 2008 New Zealand general election
Members of the New Zealand House of Representatives
21st-century New Zealand politicians
Candidates in the 2017 New Zealand general election